Joan Ørting (born March 26, 1960) is a Danish sexologist, letter column editor and former TV-host.

Biography
She edited the sexual advice letter column for the daily newspaper Ekstra Bladet, and has co-authored several self-help books on sexual topics. Since 2006 she has been running a school for sexologists.

Joan Ørting has worked as theatre director at the children and youth theatre Gawenda in Gladsaxe, and has taught drama at several high schools. She later studied to become a certified sexologist, cognitive therapist, life-coach and meditation teacher. She also gained fame from hosting the television series Sexskolen in 2006, and has also appeared in such TV-shows as Kom til mad (2006) and Varm på is (2008).

She has a smaller role in the feature film Smukke dreng (1993) and hosts the bestselling educational DVD Femi-X and Beyond (2004).

Joan Ørting is married to author Carsten Islington and lives at Langeland in southern Denmark.

She got fired from Ekstra Bladet in 2011.

Books 
 Har du lyst? (2003)
 Varm weekend - sex hele året (2008)
 Ta' mig (2008)

References

External links
 Joan Ørting homepage
 

1960 births
Danish sexologists
Living people